Un ticket pour l'espace is a French comedy film directed by Éric Lartigau released in 2006.

Plot
In the year 2005, a contest is organised to convince French people on the interest of space research and its budget. The contest consists of a scratch game with millions of scratchcards, where the two winners will receive tickets for space. The winners leave for the French orbital station with two professional astronauts and a scientist. However, once in space, the adventure takes an unexpected turn. One of the contestants, who cheated to obtain his ticket, is revealed to be a dangerous madman seeking for revenge.

Cast
Kad Merad as Stéphane Cardoux
Olivier Baroux as Colonel Romain Beaulieu
Marina Foïs as Soizic Le Guilvinec
Guillaume Canet as Alexandre Yonis / Alexandre Guérin / Bernard Guérin
André Dussollier as Werburger
Pierre-François Martin-Laval as Poushy
 as Professor Rochette
Frédérique Bel as Miss France
 as Hugo
 as Valérie Mertens
Jacques Lafolye as Charlemagne
 as Yves Bugier
Éric Lartigau as The director
Thierry Frémont as theater professor
Vincent Moscato as vigil
Judith El Zein as Soizic's Colleague
Anne Marivin as female astronaut
Véronique Barrault as press officer
Éric Brats as doctor
 as jailer
 as minister

External links

References

2006 films
French comedy films
French action films
French science fiction films
French parody films
Films set in the future
Miss France in fiction
Films about beauty queens
2000s French films